The steamboat Dix operated from 1904 to 1906 as part of the Puget Sound Mosquito Fleet. She was sunk in a collision which remains one of the most serious transportation accidents in the state of Washington to this day.

In May 2011, it was reported that wreckage likely to be that of the Dix had been confirmed off Seattle's Alki Point.

Construction
Dix was built in 1904 at the Tacoma yard of Crawford and Reid.. Later, given her tragic end, it was recalled, perhaps superstitiously, that the launching of Dix was a failure. The vessel had simply refused to move down the ways at Crawford and Reid, and had to be hauled into the water the next day by Captain Sutter in command of Tacoma Tug and Barge's Fairfield.

Dix was purpose-built for one route only, the run across Elliott Bay from Seattle to Alki Point, then the main recreation area for Seattle. Her owners were A.B.C. Dennison and W.L. Dudley, doing business as the Seattle and Alki Point Transportation Company. She was lightly built, and apparently top-heavy, as the steamboat inspectors twice refused to issue her a seaworthiness certificate, only relenting when her builders installed 7 tons of gravel ballast in her hull and 5 tons of iron weights bolted to her keel. Even so, she was said to be difficult to handle.

Operations
Dennison and Dudley put Dix on the intended Seattle-Alki route. In summer service with their other steamer Manette the two boats made nineteen trips daily. During the legislative session in early 1905, Dix was placed on the Olympia-Tacoma route. The fast sternwheeler Greyhound was already on that run and there wasn't much business left over, so in January 1905 Dix was returned to the Alki run.

Sinking of Dix
On November 18, 1906, Dix was not on her customary Alki route, but was acting as a relief boat for Monticello on the Seattle-Port Blakely run. She left Seattle with about 77 passengers. Her captain, Percy Lermond, tasked with collecting fares, was absent from the pilot house, leaving the mate Charles Dennison in charge. Theoretically fare collection was a job for the purser, but on the smaller vessels, it was customary for the master to perform this function.

The evening was calm and somewhat clear, and as the vessel steamed west past Alki Point into the open Sound, Captain Lermond went to his quarters behind the pilot house to tally the fares. Off Duwamish Head, Dix approached near the Alaska Coast Company steamer Jeanie and then mate Dennison (who it turns out was unlicensed) inexplicably turned the vessel directly into Jeanies path. Jeanie was ten times the size of Dix and loaded with iron ore. Even though Jeanie had already reversed her engines, and was barely under steerage way, the impact was sufficient, given the much greater weight of Jeanie, to cause Dix to heel sharply over on her port side. Captain Lermond described the terrifying scene:

Impact of sinking
The shock of the survivors was great, as a newspaper account of the time showed:

Reports of the number of passengers lost vary; The New York Times, having received a dispatch from Portland, Oregon about the sinking, reported the number lost as 40; Years later, in a 1913 story about Jeanies loss off Calvert Island, the Times reported the number of passengers lost by the sinking of Dix as 54. A 2011 Seattle Times article said the number was "as many as 45", when another source has it as over 45 people, including Charles Dennison. Mrs. Byler's sons, Charles and Christian, and their sister, Lillian, were all trapped below deck and taken down when the ship sank.

The chief engineer, George F. Parks also drowned. The wreck was sunk so deep that salvage operations were impossible. No bodies were ever recovered; the people were trapped inside and went down with her. Most of the Dix victims were from Port Blakely, and the place was hit hard, that night in the little town being described as "running of a gauntlet of shrieks and moans of grief-stricken wives and mothers ..." Work stopped briefly at the huge Port Blakely Lumber Mill for the first time in the mill's history.

Captain Lermond was one of the survivors, indeed he died only in 1959, at the age of 90 years. Following the Dix sinking, his master's and pilot licenses were revoked.  The Steamboat Inspection Service found Dix totally at fault for failure to keep an efficient lookout and that the captain, who had been acting as both master and fare collector at the time of the accident, was found to have negligently relinquished his control of the steamer to an unqualified person. Captain Lermond had apparently failed to protest the requirement he collect fares for fear of his job.

Although his license was reinstated a year later, Captain Lermond served in command of tugs only for the rest of his career until 1933, never again commanding a passenger vessel.

Though the fault was placed with Dix and captain Lermond it was found during the investigation that Jeanie was navigating in violation of law with only one engineer, the first assistant, on the engine; without the knowledge of the ship's master. The circumstances of the loss of Dix were all the more shocking to the people on the Sound, who depended on the steamboats for their basic transportation.

In 1973, a memorial to Dix was dedicated in a small park at Duwamish Head.

References

External links
"Wreck of the Mosquito Fleet Steamer Dix discovered in Elliott Bay"
"Explorers Find Historic SS Dix Shipwreck In Seattle's Elliott Bay; 'An Important Piece Of Local History'"
“The SS Dix collides and sinks off Alki Point, with a loss of 39 lives, on November 18, 1906", HistoryLink.org (accessed 2/25/2008)

Steamboats of Washington (state)
Ships sunk in collisions
Propeller-driven steamboats of Washington (state)
Maritime incidents in 1906
Shipwrecks of the Washington coast
1904 ships
Ships built by Crawford and Reid
November 1906 events